Mohammad Mohammadullah (21 October 1921 – 12 November 1999) was the President of the People's Republic of Bangladesh. Mohammadullah became the Acting President on 24 December 1973, was elected president on 24 January 1974, and took oath of office on 27 January 1974. He remained President until 25 January 1975.

Birth and education

Mohammadullah was born in Saicha, Raipur, Lakshmipur, on 21 October 1921. His father Munshi Abdul Wahab was a social worker. In 1943, he completed his secondary school certificate from Lakshmipur Adarsha Samad Government High School. Mohammadullah earned a bachelor's degree with honours in history from Dhaka University and obtained LLB degree from Ripon College Kolkata and again from Dhaka University in the same year 1948. In 1950, he became a member of the Dhaka Bar. In 1964, he was enrolled in Dhaka High Court as an advocate.

Political life
Mohammadullah was an active member of the East Pakistan Awami League from 1950. He had walked into the Awami League office in Nawabpur and told Sheikh Mujibur Rahman he would like to volunteer for Awami League and started working in office management. In 1953, he was elected as office secretary of East Pakistan and held the same position till 1972 after being nominated by Sheikh Mujibur Rahman. He actively participated in the six point movement in 1966, for which he was jailed for a long time.
Mohammadullah was elected to the East Pakistan Provincial Assembly on the ticket of the Awami League in 1970. He was appointed as the political advisor to the Acting President Syed Nazrul Islam during the Bangladesh Liberation War in 1971.

On 10 April 1972, he was elected as the Deputy Speaker of the Bangladesh Constituent Assembly (Ganoparishad) and the same year he became the acting Speaker. On 12 November 1972, he was elected Speaker. He was elected to the Member of the Parliament (JS) from the Raipur-Lakshmipur constituency, and was re-elected Speaker of the House again in 1973.

He became the Acting President of the Republic on 24 December 1973 and President on 24 January 1974.
In January 1975, the fourth amendment was passed which removed then President Mohammad Mohammadullah from office and made Bangabandhu Sheikh Mujibur Rahman president for a five-year term.

He was made Minister of Land Administration and Land Reforms in the Cabinet of Sheikh Mujibur Rahman on 26 January 1975. He was appointed as the Vice President by collaborators of the Assassination of Sheikh Mujib on August 1975. Mohammadullah joined the Bangladesh Nationalist Party (BNP) in 1980. He was appointed vice president by President Abdus Sattar in March 1982 but the tenure lasted barely a year, because General Hussain Muhammad Ershad took over the reins of administration of the country. Mohammadullah was elected a member of the parliament (JS) once again in 1991 on BNP ticket.

Death
Mohammadullah died on 12 November 1999 at the age of 78. He was buried at Banani graveyard near Naval Headquarters.

Honours 
  King Jigme Singye Investiture Medal (Kingdom of Bhutan, 02/06/1974).

References

External links 
 Biography of Mohammadullah in bangabhaban.gov.bd

1921 births
1999 deaths
Surendranath College alumni
Surendranath Law College alumni
Vice presidents of Bangladesh
Speakers of the Jatiya Sangsad
Awami League politicians
Bangladesh Nationalist Party politicians
Presidents of Bangladesh
University of Calcutta alumni
University of Dhaka alumni
Burials at Banani Graveyard
1st Jatiya Sangsad members
5th Jatiya Sangsad members
20th-century Bengalis